The 1965 Colgate Red Raiders football team was an American football team that represented Colgate University as an independent during the 1965 NCAA University Division football season. Head coach Hal Lahar returned for the fourth consecutive year, and the ninth overall. His 1965 team compiled a 6–3–1 record. John Paske was the team captain. 

The team played its home games at Colgate Athletic Field in Hamilton, New York.

Schedule

Leading players 
Statistical leaders for the 1965 Red Raiders included: 
 Rushing: Marvin Hubbard, 655 yards and 7 touchdowns on 167 attempts
 Passing: Robert Mark, 320 yards, 27 completions and 1 touchdown on 67 attempts
 Receiving: Paul Port, 164 yards and 2 touchdowns on 14 receptions
 Total offense: Marvin Hubbard, 621 yards (all rushing)
 Scoring: Marvin Hubbard, 48 points from 7 touchdowns, 4 PATs and 1 two-point conversion
 All-purpose yards: Marvin Hubbard, 763 yards (621 rushing, 90 receiving, 52 kickoff returning)

References

Colgate
Colgate Raiders football seasons
Colgate Red Raiders football